David Wingfield (April 21, 1894 – date of death unknown) was an American Negro league second baseman between 1920 and 1923. 

A native of Washington, Georgia, Wingfield was convicted for his part in a fatal 1915 gun fight while serving in the 10th Cavalry Regiment. At Leavenworth Federal Penitentiary, Wingfield honed his baseball skills. He played for the prison's African American team, known as the "Booker T's", a team that produced three other future Negro leaguers: Roy Tyler, Albert Street, and Joe Fleet. He was released from Leavenworth in 1919, and quickly found work in professional baseball. His Negro leagues debut came in 1920 for the Dayton Marcos, and he went on to play for the Detroit Stars and Toledo Tigers.

References

External links
 and Seamheads

1894 births
Place of death missing
Year of death missing
Dayton Marcos players
Detroit Stars players
Toledo Tigers players
Baseball infielders